Matías Vitkieviez (born 16 May 1985) is a Uruguayan-born Swiss association footballer who plays for Étoile Carouge.

Early life
Vitkieviez lived in Montevideo, Uruguay, until 1999 when together with his mother and brother he emigrated to Geneva, Switzerland because of family economic problems. Geneva being the city where Vitkieviez's grandfather once lived. Vitkieviez's grandfather is famous Polish painter Stanisław Witkiewicz and his son Stanisław Ignacy Witkiewicz.Matias Vitkieviez is the brother of Mateo Vitkieviez and Nicolas Vitkieviez.

Club career
Vitkieviez started his football in Switzerland in the Étoile Carouge youth department. He started his senior football in 2003 in France with Louhans-Cuiseaux, but after just a few months transferred to EA Guingamp. One year later he returned to Étoile Carouge.

In August 2006, Vitkieviez was transferred to Swiss Challenge League side Servette. The team achieved promotion to the Top League in the 2010–11season. He made his debut in the top division on 23 July 2011 against Zürich in the 2–1 away win.

On 16 January 2012 his transfer to BSC Young Boys was announced, for the sum of €100,000. On 10 January 2013, he was loaned back to his former club Servette, the contract dated up until 30 June 2013.

International career
He debuted in the Swiss national team on 29 February 2012 in Bern against Argentina in a friendly match replacing Eren Derdiyok in the minute 87'.

Statistics

Honours
'Servette
2010–11 Swiss Challenge League runner-up

References

External links
 
 
 
 

1985 births
Living people
Footballers from Montevideo
Association football wingers
Association football forwards
Uruguayan footballers
Swiss men's footballers
Swiss people of Polish descent
Swiss people of Uruguayan descent
Uruguayan people of Polish descent
Switzerland international footballers
Championnat National players
Championnat National 2 players
Swiss Super League players
Swiss Challenge League players
Louhans-Cuiseaux FC players
En Avant Guingamp players
Étoile Carouge FC players
Servette FC players
BSC Young Boys players
FC St. Gallen players
Expatriate footballers in France
Uruguayan emigrants to Switzerland
Naturalised citizens of Switzerland